Laurentius Guild (Laurentiusgildet) is a historical European martial arts group headquartered in Aarhus, Denmark with chapters in Nyborg and Vordingborg. Its membership consists of academic researchers specializing in fencing with a focus on the 14th and 15th centuries.

Description

Led by Frede Jensen of Randers Museum, the group provides organized instruction in the study and practice of historical European swordplay with a particular focus on longsword fencing, with or without armour, and on sword and buckler fencing. It is one of several northern European groups of students and researchers in the area of medieval martial arts. Established in 2004, it is a small historical European martial arts group whose members are mainly from Aarhus University, especially those specializing in medieval archaeology or history. 

The Nyborg chapter specialises in longsword, rapier, and poleaxe. Indeed, longsword interpretation across the Guild is led by Claus Sørensen, a medieval archeologist based in Nyborg Castle. Methodology is based on fencing manuscripts from the 14th to 17th centuries with a focus on the 14th and 15th centuries.  This is enhanced with the practical knowledge gained through solo and partnered drilling, and free play (sparring). In this way, it follows a similar methodology to experimental archeology.

The Laurentius Guild is part of HEMAC (Historical European Martial Arts Coalition), which is a pan-European organization of martial artists and researchers dedicated to the study of traditional European fighting arts and martial traditions.

See also

Fiore dei Liberi
Johannes Liechtenauer
Swordsmanship
German school of swordsmanship
Italian school of swordsmanship
Historical European martial arts
Association for Renaissance Martial Arts

References

External links
Official site

Historical European martial arts revival
Historical fencing
Organizations established in 2004
Martial arts organizations
Non-profit organizations based in Denmark